Carsten Smith (1817–1884) was a Norwegian civil servant and politician. He was the county governor of Nordland county from 1858 until 1867.  He then became the county governor of Nordre Trondhjem county from 1867 until his death in 1884.

References

1817 births
1884 deaths
County governors of Norway
County governors of Nordland